The 1984 UCI Track Cycling World Championships were the World Championship for track cycling. They took place in Barcelona, Catalonia, Spain in 1984. Due to the 1984 Summer Olympics only nine events were contested, 7 for men (5 for professionals, 2 for amateurs) and 2 for women.

Medal summary

Medal table

References

Track cycling
UCI Track Cycling World Championships by year
International cycle races hosted by Spain
1984 in track cycling
Sports competitions in Barcelona